Erjon Tola (born 15 December 1986) is an Albanian alpine ski racer who represented Albania at the 2006, 2010, 2014 and 2018 Winter Olympics.

Biography
Tola was born in Tirana in 1986. He trains in Italy and has been living in Cervinia since 1992.

Career
At his first Olympics appearance in 2006, Tola was ranked last among those who finished the men's super-G, but finished 35th in the men's giant slalom. Tola finished 48th in the men's slalom and 63rd in the men's giant slalom at the 2010 Winter Olympics in Vancouver. 

During 2013 he participated for the first time in both the World Ski Championships and the World Cup.

Although Tola represented Albania again at the 2014 Winter Olympics, due to injury suffered during a training session he was not able to take part in any competitions.

In 2018 he and Suela Mehilli represented Albania at the Winter Olympic Games in South Korea. It was his fourth and her second Olympics.

He obtained his best career placement in the Slalom competition at the 2021 World Championships held in Cortina d'Ampezzo.

References

External links
 
 
 Videos of Erjon Tola in the 2010 Winter Olympics

1986 births
Living people
Albanian male alpine skiers
Alpine skiers at the 2006 Winter Olympics
Alpine skiers at the 2010 Winter Olympics
Alpine skiers at the 2014 Winter Olympics
Alpine skiers at the 2018 Winter Olympics
Olympic alpine skiers of Albania
Sportspeople from Tirana